Diffo Bridge is a pre-stressed concrete box girder bridge over the Diffo river (Chipu river) in Arunachal Pradesh, India.

Construction
The construction started in 2011 by Border Roads Organisation under Project Udayank. Tough working conditions in an inhospitable terrain facing turbulent flash floods, made construction difficult. It was completed in 8 years. The bridge was inaugurated by the Union Defense Minister Nirmala Sitharaman on 18 January 2019.

Significance

Earlier, Indian Defense Forces had laid the Bailey bridge over the Diffo Rrver. It was a temporary structure that had to be closed during most  rains. The new bridge provides uninterrupted access between Dibang Valley and Lohit valley of Eastern Arunachal Pradesh on Roing-Koron-Paya Road. Lohit valley is the corridor that leads to Kibithu, the battleground of the 1962 Indo-Sino war and Lower Dibang Valley leads to the Anini front of border with China. The bridge reduced traveling time between Tezu and Roing (district headquarters of Lohit Valley and Lower Dibang Valley respectively) from 3 hours to 45 minutes. During a monsoon, the old route took travelers through Assam.  Strategically, it provides an all-weather route for troops deployed on the China border (the McMahon line).

References

2019 establishments in Arunachal Pradesh
Bridges completed in 2019
Bridges in Arunachal Pradesh